The Seaside Music Festival was an annual rain-or-shine, three-day festival held in Seaside Heights, New Jersey. The festival took place in various restaurants, bars, and other venues in Seaside Heights, New Jersey, featuring performances in various genres by local and touring bands from around the U.S. and the world. There were typically around 120 musical acts that performed at the festival.

Festival History
Seaside Music Festival was founded by Indian and Mike Schwartz, and was produced by Motor Media. The festival began as an idea to produce a free concert on the beach, and quickly grew into a multi-venue free-admission music festival at the beach. The inaugural event included up-and-coming global bands that shared their talents in 15 venues other various activities.

Seaside Music Festival drew about 50,000 attendees each year. Past event attractions include:
 Live bands on multiple stages (bars, restaurants, outdoor)
 BMX and motorcycle stunt shows
 New Jersey Devils inflatable ice rink
 Billabong Surf Clinic
 Barooo Surf Shop Skimboard clinic
 The United Way Live United Village
 Vendor Village on the Boardwalk
 Car Show
 All-ages stage on the beach
 Casino Pier and boardwalk amusements, restaurants, and games open
 Saturday Night Fireworks

References

External links
 Seaside Music Festival website

Music festivals in New Jersey
Tourist attractions in Ocean County, New Jersey
Landmarks in New Jersey
Rock festivals in the United States
Counterculture festivals
Music festivals established in 2008